George Clancy may refer to:

 George Clancy (politician) (1881–1921), Irish nationalist politician and mayor of Limerick
 George Clancy (rugby union) (born 1977), Irish rugby union referee

See also
 George Clancey (1881–1921), American actor